Patrick Hughes (24 March 1909 – 2 September 1994) was an Irish boxer. He competed in the men's bantamweight event at the 1932 Summer Olympics.

References

External links
 

1909 births
1994 deaths
Irish male boxers
Olympic boxers of Ireland
Boxers at the 1932 Summer Olympics
Sportspeople from Dublin (city)
Bantamweight boxers